Blackstone River is a river in the U.S. states of Massachusetts and Rhode Island.

Blackstone River may also refer to:

Rivers:
 Blackstone River (Alberta), Canada
 Blackstone River (Yukon), Canada, a tributary of the Peel Watershed

Other:
 Blackstone River Bikeway, a planned paved trail defining the course of the East Coast Greenway in the United States

See also 
 Blackstone (disambiguation)